Scurteşti may refer to several villages in Romania:

 Scurteşti, a village in Vadu Pașii Commune, Buzău County
 Scurteşti, a village in Ștefești Commune, Prahova County